Lille is a city in the northern part of France, in French Flanders. On the river Deûle, near France's border with Belgium, it is the capital of the Hauts-de-France region, the prefecture of the Nord department, and the main city of the European Metropolis of Lille.

The city of Lille and 94 suburban French municipalities have formed since 2015 the European Metropolis of Lille, an indirectly elected metropolitan authority now in charge of wider metropolitan issues, with a population of 1,182,250 at the Jan. 2020 census.

More broadly, Lille belongs to a vast conurbation formed with the Belgian cities of Mouscron, Kortrijk, Tournai and Menin, which gave birth in January 2008 to the Eurometropolis Lille–Kortrijk–Tournai, the first European Grouping of Territorial Cooperation (EGTC), which has more than 2.1 million inhabitants.

Nicknamed in France the "Capital of Flanders", Lille and its surroundings belong to the historical region of Romance Flanders, a former territory of the county of Flanders that is not part of the linguistic area of West Flanders. A garrison town (as evidenced by its Citadel), Lille has had an eventful history from the Middle Ages to the French Revolution. Very often besieged during its history, it belonged successively to the Kingdom of France, the Burgundian State, the Holy Roman Empire of Germany and the Spanish Netherlands before being definitively attached to the France of Louis XIV following the War of Spanish Succession along with the entire territory making up the historic province of French Flanders. Lille was again under siege in 1792 during the Franco-Austrian War, and in 1914 and 1940. It was severely tested by the two world wars of the 20th century during which it was occupied and suffered destruction.

A merchant city since its origins and a manufacturing city since the 16th century, the Industrial Revolution made it a great industrial capital, mainly around the textile and mechanical industries. Their decline, from the 1960s onwards, led to a long period of crisis and it was not until the 1990s that the conversion to the tertiary sector and the rehabilitation of the disaster-stricken districts gave the city a different face. Today, the historic center, Old Lille, is characterized by its 17th-century red brick town houses, its paved pedestrian streets and its central Grand'Place. The belfry of the Hôtel de ville de Lille (Lille City Hall) is one of the 23 belfries in the Nord-Pas-de-Calais and Somme regions that were classified as UNESCO World Heritage Sites in July 2005, in recognition of their architecture and importance to the rise of municipal power in Europe.

The construction of the brand-new Euralille business district in 1988 (now the third largest in France) and the arrival of the TGV and then the Eurostar in 1994 put Lille at the heart of the major European capitals. The development of its international airport, annual events such as the Braderie de Lille in early September (attracting three million visitors), the development of a student and university center (with more than 110,000 students, the third largest in France behind Paris and Lyon), its ranking as a European Capital of Culture in 2004 and the events of Lille 2004 (European Capital of Culture) and Lille 3000 are the main symbols of this revival. The European metropolis of Lille was awarded the "World Design Capital 2020".

History

Origins
Archeological digs seem to show the area as inhabited by as early as 2000 BC, most notably in the modern quartiers of Fives, Wazemmes and Vieux Lille. The original inhabitants of the region were the Gauls, such as the Menapians, the Morins, the Atrebates and the Nervians, who were followed by Germanic peoples: the Saxons, the Frisians and the Franks.

The legend of "Lydéric and Phinaert" puts the foundation of the city of Lille at 640. In the 8th century, the language of Old Low Franconian was spoken, as attested by toponymic research. Lille's Dutch name is Rijsel, which comes from ter ijsel (at the island) from Middle Dutch ijssel ("small island, islet"), calque of Old French l'Isle ("the Island"), itself from Latin Īnsula, from īnsula ("island").

From 830 to around 910, the Vikings invaded Flanders. After the destruction caused by Normans' and the Magyars' invasion, the eastern part of the region was ruled by various local princes.

The first mention of the town dates from 1066: apud Insulam (Latin for "at the island"). It was then controlled by the County of Flanders, as were the regional cities (the Roman cities Boulogne, Arras, Cambrai as well as the Carolingian cities Valenciennes, Saint-Omer, Ghent and Bruges). The County of Flanders thus extended to the left bank of the Scheldt, one of the richest and most prosperous regions of Europe.

Middle Ages
The Carolingian duke Évrard lived in the city in the 9th century and participated in many of the day's political and military affairs. There was an important Battle of Lille in 1054. Raimbert of Lille (fl. c. 1100) was an early nominalist who taught at Lille.

From the 12th century, the fame of the Lille cloth fair began to grow. In 1144 Saint-Sauveur parish was formed, which would give its name to the modern-day quartier Saint-Sauveur.

The counts of Flanders, Boulogne, and Hainaut came together with England and East Frankia and tried to regain territory taken by Philip II of France following Henry II of England's death, a war that ended with the French victory at Bouvines in 1214. Infante Ferdinand, Count of Flanders was imprisoned and the county fell into dispute: it would be his wife, Jeanne, Countess of Flanders and Constantinople, who ruled the city. She was said to be well loved by the residents of Lille, who by that time numbered 10,000.

In 1225, the street performer and juggler Bertrand Cordel, doubtlessly encouraged by local lords, tried to pass himself off as Baldwin I of Constantinople (the father of Jeanne of Flanders), who had disappeared at the battle of Adrianople. He pushed the counties of Flanders and Hainaut towards sedition against Jeanne in order to recover his land. She called her cousin, Louis VIII ("The Lion"). He unmasked the imposter, whom Countess Jeanne quickly had hanged. In 1226 the king agreed to free Infante Ferdinand, Count of Flanders. Count Ferrand died in 1233, and his daughter Marie soon after. In 1235, Jeanne granted a city charter by which city governors would be chosen each All Saint's Day by four commissioners chosen by the ruler. On 6 February 1236, she founded the Countess's Hospital (Hospice Comtesse). It was in her honour that the hospital of the Regional Medical University of Lille was named "Jeanne of Flanders Hospital" in the 20th century.

The Countess died in 1244 in the Abbey of Marquette, leaving no heirs. The rule of Flanders and Hainaut thus fell to her sister, Margaret II, Countess of Flanders, then to Margaret's son, Guy of Dampierre. Lille fell under the rule of France from 1304 to 1369, after the Franco-Flemish War (1297–1305).

The county of Flanders fell to the Duchy of Burgundy next, after the 1369 marriage of Margaret III, Countess of Flanders, and Philip the Bold, Duke of Burgundy. Lille thus became one of the three capitals of said Duchy, along with Brussels and Dijon. By 1445, Lille counted some 25,000 residents. Philip the Good, Duke of Burgundy, was even more powerful than the King of France, and made Lille an administrative and financial capital.

On 17 February 1454, one year after the taking of Constantinople by the Turks, Philip the Good organised a Pantagruelian banquet at his Lille palace, the still-celebrated "Feast of the Pheasant". There the Duke and his court undertook an oath to Christianity.

In 1477, at the death of the last duke of Burgundy, Charles the Bold, Mary of Burgundy married Maximilian of Austria, who thus became Count of Flanders.

Early modern era

The 16th and the 17th centuries were marked by a boom in the regional textile industry, the Protestant revolts and outbreaks of the plague.

Lille came under the rule of the Holy Roman Emperor Charles V in 1519. The Low Countries fell to his eldest son, Philip II of Spain, in 1555. The city remained under Spanish Habsburg rule until 1668.
Calvinism first appeared in the area in 1542, and by 1555, the authorities were taking steps to suppress that form of Protestantism. In 1566, the countryside around Lille was affected by the Iconoclastic Fury. In 1578, the Hurlus, a group of Protestant rebels, stormed the castle of the Counts of Mouscron. They were removed four months later by a Catholic Wallon regiment, and they tried several times between 1581 and 1582 to take the city of Lille, all in vain. The Hurlus were notably held back by the legendary Jeanne Maillotte. At the same time (1581), at the call of Elizabeth I of England, the north of the Seventeen Provinces, having gained a Protestant majority, successfully revolted and formed the Dutch Republic. The war brought or exacerbated periods of famine and plague (the last in 1667–1679).

The first printer to set up shop in Lille was Antoine Tack in 1594. The 17th century saw the building of new institutions: an Irish College in 1610, a Jesuit college in 1611, an Augustinian college in 1622, almshouses or hospitals such as the Maison des Vieux hommes in 1624 and the Bonne et Forte Maison des Pauvres in 1661, and of a Mont-de-piété in 1626.

Unsuccessful French attacks on the city were launched in 1641 and 1645. In 1667, Louis XIV of France (the Sun King) successfully laid siege to Lille, resulting in it becoming French in 1668 under the Treaty of Aix-la-Chapelle, provoking discontent among the citizens of the prosperous city. A number of important public works undertaken between 1667 and 1670, such as the Citadel (erected by Vauban), or the creation of the quartiers of Saint-André and la Madeleine, enabled the French king to gradually gain the confidence of his new subjects in Lille, some of whom continued to feel Flemish, but they had always spoken the Romance Picard language.

For five years, from 1708 to 1713, the city was occupied by the Dutch during the War of the Spanish Succession. Throughout the 18th century, Lille remained profoundly Catholic. It took little part in the French Revolution, but there were riots and the destruction of churches. In 1790, the city held its first municipal elections.

Post-French Revolution
In 1792, in the aftermath of the French Revolution, the Austrians, then in the United Provinces, laid siege to Lille. The "Column of the Goddess", erected in 1842 in the "Grand-Place" (officially named ), is a tribute to the city's resistance, led by Mayor . Although Austrian artillery destroyed many houses and the main church of the city, the city did not surrender, and the Austrian Army left after eight days.

The city continued to grow and, by 1800, had some 53,000 residents, leading to Lille becoming the seat of the Nord départment in 1804. In 1846, a railway connecting Paris and Lille was built. In the early the 19th century, Napoleon I's continental blockade against the United Kingdom led to Lille's textile industry developing even more fully. The city was known for its cotton while the nearby towns of Roubaix and Tourcoing worked wool. Leisure activities were thoroughly organised in 1858 for the 80,000 inhabitants. Cabarets or taverns for the working class numbered 1,300, or one for every three houses. At that time the city counted 63 drinking and singing clubs, 37 clubs for card players, 23 for bowling, 13 for skittles, and 18 for archery. The churches likewise have their social organizations. Each club had a long roster of officers, and a busy schedule of banquets festivals and competitions. In 1853, Alexandre Desrousseaux composed his lullaby "P'tit quinquin".

In 1858, Lille annexed the adjacent towns of Esquermes, Fives, Moulins-Lille and Wazemmes. Lille's population was 158,000 in 1872, growing to over 200,000 by 1891. In 1896 Lille became the first city in France to be led by a socialist, Gustave Delory.

By 1912, Lille's population stood at 217,000. The city profited from the Industrial Revolution, particularly via coal and the steam engine. The entire region grew wealthy thanks to its mines and textile industry.

First World War

Lille's occupation by the Germans began on 13 October 1914 after a ten-day siege and heavy shelling, which destroyed 882 apartment and office blocks and 1,500 houses, mostly around the railway station and in the centre. By the end of October, the city was being run by German authorities.
Because Lille was only 20 km from the battlefield, German troops passed through the city regularly on their way to and from the front. As a result, occupied Lille became a place for the hospitalisation and the treatment of wounded soldiers as well as a place for soldiers' relaxation and entertainment. Many buildings, homes and businesses were requisitioned to those ends.

Lille was liberated by the Allies on 17 October 1918, when General Sir William Birdwood and his troops were welcomed by joyous crowds. The general was made an honorary citizen of the city of Lille on 28 October.

The only audio recording known to have been made during World War I was recorded near Lille in October 1918. The two-minute recording captured the Royal Garrison Artillery conducting a gas shell bombardment.

Lille was also the hunting ground of the German World War I flying ace Max Immelmann, who was nicknamed "the Eagle of Lille".

Années Folles, Great Depression and Popular Front

In July 1921, at the Pasteur Institute in Lille, Albert Calmette and Camille Guérin discovered the first anti-tuberculosis vaccine, known as BCG ("Bacille de Calmette et Guérin"). The Opéra de Lille, designed by Lille architect Louis M. Cordonnier, was dedicated in 1923.

From 1931, Lille felt the repercussions of the Great Depression, and by 1935, a third of the city's population lived in poverty. In 1936, the city's mayor, Roger Salengro, became Minister of the Interior of the Popular Front but eventually killed himself after right-wing groups led a slanderous campaign against him.

Second World War

During the Battle of France, Lille was besieged by German forces for several days. When Belgium was invaded, the citizens of Lille, still haunted by the events of World War I, began to flee the city in large numbers. Lille was part of the zone under control of the German commander in Brussels, and was never controlled by the Vichy government in France. Lille was instead controlled under the military administration in Northern France. The départments of Nord and Pas-de-Calais (with the exception of the coast, notably Dunkirk) were for the most part liberated from 1 to 5 September 1944, by British, Canadian and Polish troops. On 3 September, German troops began to leave Lille out of fear of the British, who were on their way from Brussels. The city was liberated by a British force consisting largely of tanks.

Rationing came to an end in 1947, and by 1948, normality had returned to Lille.

Postwar

In 1967, the Chambers of Commerce of Lille, Roubaix and Tourcoing were joined, and in 1969 the Communauté urbaine de Lille (Lille urban community) was created, linking 87 communes with Lille.

Throughout the 1960s and the 1970s, the region was faced with some problems after the decline of the coal, mining and textile industries. From the early 1980s, the city began to turn itself more towards the service sector.

Pierre Mauroy served as Mayor of Lille for 28 years from 1973 to 2001. Mauroy was Prime Minister for part of the term of Francois Mitterrand.

In 1983, the VAL, the world's first automated rapid transit underground network, opened. In 1993, a high-speed TGV train line was opened connecting Paris with Lille in one hour. This, with the opening of the Channel Tunnel in 1994 and the arrival of the Eurostar train put Lille at the centre of a triangle connecting Paris, London and Brussels.

Work on Euralille, an urban remodelling project, began in 1991. The Euralille Centre was opened in 1994, and the remodeled district is now full of parks and modern buildings containing offices, shops and apartments. In 1994 the "Grand Palais" was also opened for the general public, which is free for the public to enter on the first Sunday of every month.

21st Century

Lille was chosen as a European Capital of Culture in 2004, along with the Italian city of Genoa.

Lille and Roubaix were affected by the 2005 riots, like all of France's other urban centres.

In 2007 and again in 2010, Lille was awarded the label "Internet City".

The Saint-Joseph Chapel of Saint-Paul College was demolished in February 2021.

Climate
Lille can be described as having a temperate oceanic climate; summers normally do not reach high average temperatures, but winters can fall below freezing temperatures, but with averages quite a bit above the freezing mark. Precipitation is plentiful year round.

The table below gives average temperatures and precipitation levels for the 1991–2020 reference period.

Environment
Lille is noted for its air pollution, with a 2018 study attributing 1,700 deaths per year in the agglomeration of Lille to pollution. In 2018, Lille held France's record pollution peaks.

Population

This includes the former communes annexed by the commune of Lille: Esquermes, Fives, Moulins-Lille, and Wazemmes in 1858, Hellemmes-Lille in 1977, and Lomme in 2000.

Economy

A former major mechanical, food industry and textile manufacturing centre as well as a retail and finance center, Lille is the largest city of a conurbation, built like a network of cities: Lille, Roubaix, Tourcoing and Villeneuve-d'Ascq. The conurbation forms the Métropole Européenne de Lille which is France's fourth-largest urban conglomeration with a 2016 population of over 1.15 million.

Revenues and taxes
For centuries, Lille, a city of merchants, has displayed a wide range of incomes: great wealth and poverty have lived side by side, especially until the end of the 1800s. This contrast was noted by Victor Hugo in 1851 in his poem Les Châtiments: « Caves de Lille ! on meurt sous vos plafonds de pierre ! » ("Cellars of Lille! We die under your stone ceilings!")

Employment
Employment in Lille has switched over half a century from a predominant industry to tertiary activities and services.
Services account for 91% of employment in 2006.

Enterprises

At the end of 2015, Lille hosts around  industry or service establishments.

Main sights
Lille features an array of architectural styles with various amounts of Flemish influence, including the use of brown and red brick. In addition, many residential neighborhoods, especially in Greater Lille, consist of attached two- to three-story houses aligned in a row, with narrow gardens in the back. These architectural attributes, many uncommon in France, help make Lille a transition in France to neighboring Belgium, as well as nearby Netherlands and England, where the presence of brick, as well as row houses or the terraced house is much more prominent.

Points of interest include
 Lille Cathedral (Basilique-cathédrale Notre-Dame-de-la-Treille)
 Citadel of Lille
 Palais des Beaux-Arts de Lille
 Jardin botanique de la Faculté de Pharmacie
 Jardin botanique Nicolas Boulay
 Jardin des Plantes de Lille
 Maison Folie Moulins

La Braderie

Lille hosts an annual braderie on the first weekend in September. Its origins are thought to date back to the twelfth century and between two and three million visitors are drawn into the city. It is one of the largest gatherings of France and the largest flea market in Europe.

Many of the roads in the inner city (including much of the old town) are closed and local shops, residents and traders set up stalls in the street.

Gallery

Transport

Public transport

The Métropole Européenne de Lille has a mixed mode public transport system, which is considered one of the most modern in the whole of France. It comprises buses, trams and a driverless light metro system, all of which are operated under the Transpole name. The Lille Metro is a VAL system (véhicule automatique léger = light automated vehicle) that opened on 16 May 1983, becoming the first automatic light metro line in the world. The tram system consists of two interurban tram lines, connecting central Lille to the nearby communities of Roubaix and Tourcoing, and has 45 stops. Sixty-eight urban bus routes cover the metropolis, 8 of which reach into Belgium.

Railways

Lille is an important junction in the European high-speed rail network. It lies on the Eurostar line to London (80-minute journey). The French TGV network also puts it only 1 hour from Paris and 38 minutes from Brussels and connects it to other major centres in France such as Marseille, Lyon and Toulouse. Lille has two railway stations next to each other: Lille-Europe station (Gare de Lille-Europe), which primarily serves high-speed trains and international services (Eurostar), and Lille-Flandres station (Gare de Lille-Flandres), which primarily serves lower-speed regional trains and regional Belgian trains.

Highways

Five autoroutes pass by Lille, the densest confluence of highways in France after Paris:
 Autoroute A27 : Lille – Tournai – Brussels / Liège – Germany
 Autoroute A23 : Lille – Valenciennes
 Autoroute A1 : Lille – Arras – Paris / Reims – Lyon / Orléans / Le Havre
 Autoroute A25 : Lille – Dunkirk – Calais – England / North Belgium
 Autoroute A22 : Lille – Antwerp – Netherlands

A sixth one—the A24—would have linked Amiens to Lille if built, but the project was rejected several times then abandoned.

Air traffic
Lille Lesquin International Airport is 15 minutes from the city centre by car (11 km). In terms of shipping, it ranks fourth, with almost 38,000 tonnes of freight which pass through each year. Its passenger traffic, around 1.2 million in 2010, is modest due to the proximity to Brussels, Charleroi, and Paris-CDG airports. The airport mostly connects other French and European cities (some with low-cost airlines).

Waterways

Lille is the third-largest French river port after Paris and Strasbourg. The Deûle connects to Northern Europe via the river Scarpe and the river Scheldt (towards Belgium and the Netherlands), and internationally via the Lys (to Dunkerque and Calais).

Shipping statistics

Education
With more than 110,000 students the metropolitan area of Lille is one of France's top student cities.

 With roots from 1562 to 1793 as University of Douai, (then as Université Impériale in 1808), the State University of Lille was established in Lille in 1854 with Louis Pasteur as the first dean of its Faculty of Sciences. A school of medicine and an engineering school were also established in Lille in 1854 and the University of Lille was united as the association of existing public Faculties in 1896. It was then split into three independent university campuses in 1970: Lille 1 University of Science and Technology, Lille 2 University of Law and Health and Lille 3 Charles de Gaulle University of Humanities, Social sciences, Literature and Arts.

At the beginning of 2018 Lille 1, Lille 2 and Lille 3 merged to form the new University of Lille (student enrollment: 70,000).

It is part of the Community of Universities and Institutions (COMUE) Lille Nord de France and the European Doctoral College Lille Nord de France.

 The Arts et Métiers ParisTech, an engineering graduate school of industrial and mechanical engineering, settled in Lille in 1900. This campus is one of the eight Teaching and Research Center (CER) of the school. Its creation was decided by Pierre-Nicolas Legrand de Lérant.
 Ecole Centrale de Lille is one of the five Centrale Graduate Schools of engineering in France; it was founded in Lille city in 1854, its graduate engineering education and research center was established as Institut industriel du Nord (IDN) in 1872, in 1968 it moved in a modern campus in Lille suburb.
 École nationale supérieure de chimie de Lille was established as Institut de chimie de Lille in 1894 supporting chemistry research as followers of Kuhlmann's breakthrough works in Lille.
 École supérieure de journalisme de Lille, journalism school created in 1924.
 Skema Business School established in 1892 is ranked among the top business schools in France.
 École pour l'informatique et les nouvelles technologies settled in Lille in 2009.
 ESME-Sudria and E-Artsup settled in Lille in 2012.
 The ESA – École Supérieure des Affaires is a Business Management school established in Lille in 1990.
 IEP Sciences-Po Lille political studies institute was established in Lille in 1992.
 The Institut supérieur européen de formation par l'action is also located in Lille.
 The Institut supérieur européen de gestion group (ISEG Group) established in Lille in 1988.
 The European Doctoral College Lille Nord de France is headquartered in Lille Metropolis and includes 3,000 PhD Doctorate students supported by university research laboratories.
 The Université Catholique de Lille was founded in 1875. Today it has law, economics, medicine, physics faculties and schools. 
Among these schools is Institut catholique d'arts et métiers (ICAM) founded in 1898, ranked 20th among engineering schools, with the specificity of graduating polyvalent engineers.
École des Hautes études d'ingénieur (HEI) a school of engineering founded in 1885 and offering 10 fields of specialization.
École des hautes études commerciales du nord (EDHEC) founded in 1906. EDHEC's MSc Financial Markets program was ranked #1 worldwide by Financial Times in 2017; making it one of the most prestigious financial study programs globally. 
IESEG School of Management founded in 1964 (17th place in the latest Financial Times global ranking of the 90 best masters in management, published on Monday 12 September 2016).  
Skema Business School currently ranked within the top 5, the top 10 and top 15 business schools in France respectively. In 1924 ESJ—a leading journalism school—was established.

Lille is also site of the University and Polytechnic Federation of Lille (Fédération Universitaire et Polytechnique de Lille), a large private educational university that includes a medical school, business school, law school, etc.

Notable people

The Arts 

 Renée Adorée (1898–1933), actress
 Alfred-Pierre Agache (1843–1915), academic painter
 Ernest Joseph Bailly (1753–1823), painter
 Antoinette Bourignon (1616–1680) a French-Flemish mystic and adventurer.
 Victor Chocquet (1821–1891), patron of the arts
 Émile Bernard (1868–1941), neoimpressionist painter
 Yvonne Chauffin (1905–1995), writer, winner of the 1970 edition of the Prix Breizh
 Édouard Chimot (d. 1959), artist and illustrator, editor of the Devambez illustrated art-editions
 Léon Danchin (1887–1938), animal artist and sculptor
 Alain Decaux (1925–2016), TV presenter, minister, writer, member of the Académie française
 Pierre De Geyter (1848–1932), textile worker, composed the music of The Internationale in Lille
 Désiré Dihau (1833–1909), bassoonist and composer
 Raoul de Godewaersvelde (1928–1977), singer
 Gabriel Grovlez (1879–1944), pianist, conductor and composer
 Pierre Dubreuil (1872–1944), photographer
 Carolus-Duran (1837–1917), painter.
 Julien Duvivier (1896–1967), director
 Yvonne Furneaux (1928–), actress
 Paul Gachet (1828–1909), doctor known for treating the painter Vincent van Gogh
 Jacquemart Giélée (13th century), poet
 Constance Jablonski, (born 1991) model
 Kamini (1980–), rap singer, hits success in 2006 with the "rural-rap" Marly-Gomont
 Édouard Lalo (1823–1892), composer.
 Armand Lemay (1873–1963), architect
 Adélaïde Leroux (born 1982), actress
 Serge Lutens (born 1942), photographer, make-up artist and fashion designer
 Iris Mittenaere (born 1993), model, Miss France 2016, and Miss Universe 2016
 Philippe Noiret (1930–2006), actor
 Charles-Joseph Panckoucke, (1736–1788), intellectual and writer
 Albert Samain (1858–1900), poet.
 Ana Tijoux (born 1977), rapper and singer whose family originally was from Chile

Politics, military and public service 

 Martine Aubry (1950–), deputy, minister, and Mayor of Lille
 Madeleine Damerment (1917–1944), French Resistance fighter, Legion of Honor, Croix de Guerre, Médaille de la Résistance
 Pierre Joseph Duhem (1758–1807), physician and Montagnard
 Louis Faidherbe (1818–1889), general, founder of the city of Dakar and senator
 Charles de Gaulle (1890–1970), general, resistance fighter, President of France
 Joseph Gratry (1805−1872) theologian and author.
 Isabella of Hainault (1170–1190) Queen of France as the first wife of King Philip II. 
 Augustin Laurent (1896–1990), minister, deputy, resistance fighter, and Mayor of Lille
 Achille Liénart (1884–1973), « cardinal des ouvriers »
 Alain de Lille (ca.1128 – ca.1202) a theologian and poet.
 Yves de Lille (ca.1587–unknown), Flemish Capuchin friar and author
 Pierre Mauroy (1928–2013), deputy, senator, Prime Minister of France, and Mayor of Lille

Science & Mathematics 

 Charles Barrois (1851–1939), geologist and palaeontologist.
 Joseph Valentin Boussinesq (1842–1929), mathematician and physicist
 Albert Calmette (1863–1933) and Camille Guérin (1872–1961), scientists who discovered the antituberculosis vaccine
 Yvonne Choquet-Bruhat (1923–), mathematician and physicist
 Jean Dieudonné (1906–1992), mathematician
 Paul Hallez (1846–1938), biologist
 Joseph Kampé de Fériet (1893–1982), researcher on fluid dynamics
 Charles Frédéric Kuhlmann, (1803–1881), chemist professor
 Gaspard Thémistocle Lestiboudois (1797–1876), naturalist
 Matthias de l'Obel (1538–1616), physician to King James I of England, scientist
 Henri Padé (1863–1953), mathematician
 Paul Painlevé (1863–1933), mathematician and politician
 Louis Pasteur, (1822–1895), micro-biologist
 Jean Baptiste Perrin (1870–1942), Nobel Prize in physics

Sport 
 Maxime Agueh (born 1978), footballer
 Sanaa Altama (born 1990), footballer
 Alain Baclet (born 1986), footballer
 Nabil Bentaleb (born 1994), footballer
 Ismael Ehui (born 1986), footballer
 Patrick Francheterre (born 1948), ice hockey player, coach and manager
 Amandine Henry (born 1989), footballer
 Gaël Kakuta, footballer
 Clarck N'Sikulu, footballer
 Sarah Ousfar (born 1993), basketball player
 Alassane Pléa, footballer
 Lucas Pouille, tennis player
 Alain Raguel (born 1976), footballer
 Antoine Sibierski (born 1974), footballer
 Didier Six (born 1954), footballer
 Philippe Suywens (born 1971), footballer
 Jerry Vandam, footballer
 Raphaël Varane (born 1993), footballer
 Abdellah Zoubir (born 1991), footballer

Media and sports
Local newspapers include Nord éclair and La Voix du Nord.

France's national public television network has a channel that focuses on the local area: France 3 Nord-Pas-de-Calais.

The city's most major association football club, Lille OSC, currently plays in Ligue 1, the highest level of football in France. The club has won eight major national trophies and regularly features in the UEFA Champions League and UEFA Europa League. In the 2010–11 season, Lille won the league and cup double. In 2020–21, they won the league and supercup.

Lille's Stade Pierre-Mauroy was the playground for the final stages of the FIBA EuroBasket 2015.
The same venue will host handball at the 2024 Summer Olympics as Paris getting the city being part instead football, where the city was eliminated as co-host city.
It was in Lille that the 100th World Esperanto Congress took place, in 2015.

International relations

Lille is twinned with:

 Buffalo, United States
 Cologne, Germany
 Erfurt, Germany
 Esch-sur-Alzette, Luxembourg
 Haifa, Israel
 Kharkiv, Ukraine
 Leeds, England, United Kingdom
 Liège, Belgium
 Nablus, Palestine
 Oujda, Morocco
 Rotterdam, Netherlands
 Saint-Louis, Senegal
 Tlemcen, Algeria
 Turin, Italy
 Valladolid, Spain
 Wrocław, Poland

References

Sources

External links

  - Official website

 
Communes of Nord (French department)
Prefectures in France
Cities in France
French Flanders